Amsden is a surname. Notable people with the surname include:

Alice Amsden (1943–2012), American political economist
C. S. Amsden (1856–1943), American politician
Elizabeth Amsden (1881–1966), American opera singer and actress
Frederick J. Amsden, 19th-century American architect
Janet Amsden, British actress
Ralph Amsden (1917–1988), American basketball player

See also
Amsden Formation, a geological formation in Montana, United States